"No Need to Worry" is a song written by S. J. Cooper and G. P. White and originally recorded by the duo of Johnny Cash and June Carter.

Released in September 1971 as a single (Columbia 4-45431, with "I'll Be Loving You" on the opposite side), the song reached number 15 on U.S. Billboard country chart for the week of October 23.

The track was later included on Cash's 1972 compilation album International Superstar.

Track listing

Charts

References

External links 
 "No Need to Worry" on the Johnny Cash official website

Johnny Cash songs
June Carter Cash songs
1971 songs
1971 singles
Columbia Records singles